San Martín del Rey Aurelio (Asturian: Samartín del Rei Aurelio) is a municipality of the Autonomous Community of the Principality of Asturias in northern Spain.

There are three main towns in the municipality: Sotrondio, El Entrego, and Blimea, and many villages, such as Santa Bárbara and La Hueria.

It is situated in the central part of Asturias, just below the Sierra de San Mamés, part of the Cantabrian Mountains. The Nalón River, the longest river in Asturias, crosses the municipality. The Redes Natural Park is located nearby.

Historically a mining location, nowadays it is in a re-industrial process with the emigration of many young people (about 30% of under 30). New computer based factories are attempting to establish themselves.

Parishes
There are five parroquias:
Blimea
Cocañín
Linares
Rey Aurelio
Santa Bárbara

Politics
The current mayor is Enrique Fernández Rodríguez (FSA-PSOE).

Gallery

References

External links

Municipalities in Asturias